Upton St Leonards is a village in the English county of Gloucestershire. Forming part of the district of Stroud, it is a mile or so north of the A46 road between Stroud and Cheltenham.

Facilities
The village has two four-star hotels (Hatton Court Hotel and Bowden Hall Hotel) a Church of England parish church, a pub, a primary school, and a village hall.

The village has won the Bledisloe Cup for the Best Kept Village in Gloucestershire in the large village category more than 20 times, most recently in 2006.

Governance
An electoral ward in the same name exists. This ward stretches south from Upton St. Leonards to Harescombe. The total population of the ward as at the 2011 census was 2,845.

Clubs and societies
The village has a branch of the Mothers' Union and of the Women's Institute.

The village also has a successful local football side that run two teams within the Stroud District Football league; the First team won the 2010/2011 Division 3 title and moved into Division 2 in 2011. The 2011/2012 season proved successful with both the first and second teams winning their respective divisions. The reserve team also added a County Cup title to the league titles.

See also
 Edward Vivian Birchall

References

External links

Villages in Gloucestershire
Stroud District
Civil parishes in Gloucestershire